Winnie Nanyondo (born 23 August 1993, in Mulago) is a Ugandan middle- and long-distance runner. She has represented her native country in several important international events, including both the 2016 Rio Olympics and 2020 Tokyo Olympics, the 2014 World University Cross Country Championships, the 2014 Commonwealth Games, the 2013 Summer Universiade, and the 2012 World Junior Championships in Athletics.

Career

2012–2013
At the 2012 World Junior Championships, she reached the final in the 800 metres after running a personal best of 2:02.38 in her semi-final. The final was won by American Ajee' Wilson in a personal best of 2:00.91, with Nanyondo finishing a disappointing last in 2:07.23.

A year later, at the 2013 Summer Universiade in the 800 metres, her 2:02.96 finish time in the semi-finals was not fast enough to advance to the final. Nor did her 4:28.77 finish time in the semi-finals of the 1500 metres qualify her for the final.

2014
In 2014, Uganda hosted the Universiade World Cross Country Championships. Nanyondo took a 30-second victory to lead the home team to a 1-2-3 sweep and the team championship.

Later in the year, she improved her track performance, taking her 800 metres time under 2:00.00 with a 1:59.27 race-winning performance in the Golden Spike Ostrava meet.

A little more than a month later, at the Herculis meet in Monaco, she again improved her personal best in the 800 meters to 1:58.63, which placed her third behind second-place finisher and 2013 world champion Eunice Sum (1:57.92) and the winner Ajee' Wilson (1:57.67).
 
At the 2014 Commonwealth Games in Glasgow, Scotland, Nanyondo won a bronze medal for finishing third in the 800 metres final with a time of 2:01.38, just behind Sum of Kenya and Lynsey Sharp of Scotland.

2015–2016
In 2015 and 2016, she raced slower than her personal best in the 800 metres, failing to run faster than 2 minutes flat. She ran her season's best time of 2:01.97 at a race in  Kortrijk, Belgium on 11 July 2015, finishing third. At the 2016 Olympic Games in Rio de Janeiro, she did not advance out of the first round of the 800 metres event, finishing sixth in heat #5 in a time of 2:02.77.

However, she improved her personal best at 1500 metres in Kawasaki, Japan, on 10 May 2015, finishing the race in 4:17.13.

Education
She is an industrial art and design student at Kampala University.

International competitions

References

External links

1993 births
Living people
Ugandan female middle-distance runners
Commonwealth Games medallists in athletics
Commonwealth Games bronze medallists for Uganda
Athletes (track and field) at the 2014 Commonwealth Games
Athletes (track and field) at the 2016 Summer Olympics
Olympic athletes of Uganda
Competitors at the 2013 Summer Universiade
Athletes (track and field) at the 2015 African Games
African Games competitors for Uganda
Athletes (track and field) at the 2020 Summer Olympics
Sportspeople from Kampala
Medallists at the 2014 Commonwealth Games